Giovanni Gabrielli (died between 1603 and 1611) was an Italian actor of the commedia dell'arte, who performed under the name Sivello.

Biography
Gabrielli was particularly famous for portraying several characters talking together in different languages. The 18th-century historian Francesco Saverio Quadrio relates that Gabrielli was able to impersonate women with his voice only, without the benefit of a costume change. His portrait was engraved by Agostino Carracci.

His son Francesco Gabrielli was also a well known actor.

Publications
Two works of Gabrielli were published in Bologna in the early 17th century:
 Villanelle Nuove Composte per Giovanni Gabrielli detto il Sivello (Bologna, 1601)
 Il Studio, Comedia Nova, Composta per Giovanni Gabrielli da Modona, detto il Sivello (Bologna, 1602)

Notes

Bibliography
 Askew, Pamela (1978). "Fetti's 'Portrait of an Actor' Reconsidered", The Burlington Magazine, vol. 120, no. 899 (February 1978), pp. 59–65.
 Banham, Martin, editor (1995). The Cambridge Guide to the Theatre (new edition). Cambridge: Cambridge University Press. .
 Mahon, Denis (1947; reprint 1971). Studies in Seicento Art and Theory. London: Warburg Institute, University of London (1947). . Westport, Connecticut: Greenwood (1971). .
 Quadrio, Francesco Saverio (1744). Della storia e della ragione di ogni poesia, vol. 3, part 2. Milan: Francesco Agnelli. Copy at the Internet Archive.
 Rasi, Luigi (1897–1905). I Comici Italiani: Biografia, bibliografia, iconografia, 3 volumes. Florence: Fratelli Boca. Catalog record at HathiTrust.

External links

Commedia dell'arte
Year of birth uncertain
Year of death uncertain
17th-century deaths
17th-century Italian male actors